Bangladesh competed at the 2017 Asian Indoor and Martial Arts Games held in Ashgabat, Turkmenistan from  17 to 27 September. Bangladesh sent 11 competitors for the multi-sport event and the nation finished the competition without receiving any medals.

Participants

References 

2017 in Bangladeshi sport
Nations at the 2017 Asian Indoor and Martial Arts Games